Ilan Mizrahi (born c. 1947) is a former Mossad official and National Security Advisor to the Prime Minister of Israel.

Mizrahi attended Tel Aviv University as an undergraduate, and he earned a graduate degree in political science at the University of Haifa.

Mizrahi joined the Mossad in 1972. He became head of the human intelligence division. He served as the agency's deputy director from 2001 to 2003.

He was appointed Israel's National Security Advisor by Prime Minister Ehud Olmert in May 2006. He stepped down in November 2007.

Mizrahi is considered an Orientalist and speaks fluent Arabic.

References

Living people
Israeli civil servants
People of the Mossad
University of Haifa alumni
20th-century Israeli civil servants
21st-century Israeli civil servants
Year of birth missing (living people)